Durga Nagesh Guttula (born 11 October 1981) is an Indian Chess player with an International FIDE rating. He is also a Chess Coach, a reputed chess trainer in Mumbai and one of the most sought after chess coaches in India. He and his elder brother Balaji Guttula founded South Mumbai Chess Academy in 1996.

He was the administration head of the World Junior chess championship that concluded in Mumbai at Hotel Renaissance, Powai in October 2019.

Early life and education 

Durga Nagesh Guttula was born on 11 October 1981 in Mumbai, Maharashtra in a South Indian family to the couple Surya chandra Rao and Aruna. He completed his education in MBA. He is married to Kanaka Chandra and has two kids, Shivadikrit and Sumukha Jalsesh.

He learned chess accidentally from his neighbors just like his brother, Balaji Guttula did, in Rajahmundry. He is now the founder of SMCA with his brother and a coach in his academy.

Professional chess career 
Durga Nagesh Guttula has coached many players, who won National and International Chess Championships. Some of them are

 Siddhanth Lohia
 Suhaani Lohia
 Dev Shah
 Ananyashree Birla
 Armaan Gala
 Ananya Gupta.
 Ashwath Kaushik 
 Nivaan Khandhadia 
 Anishka Biyani 
 Aryaveer Pittie 
 Avyaay Garg
 Yohan Faridun Dotiwala

References 

Indian chess players
Chess FIDE Masters
1981 births
Living people